The Copernicus Climate Change Service (abbreviated as C3S) is one of the six thematic services provided by the European Union's Copernicus Programme. The Copernicus Programme is managed by the European Commission and the C3S is implemented by the European Centre for Medium-Range Weather Forecasts (ECMWF) and is expected to become operational in 2018.

The objective of the Copernicus Climate Change Service is to build an EU knowledge base in support of mitigation and adaptation policies for Climate Change and Global Warming. The goal of the operational Climate Change service is to provide reliable information about the current and past state of the climate, the forecasts on a seasonal time scale, and the more likely projections in the coming decades for various scenarios of greenhouse gas emissions and other Climate Change contributors.

Further reading

Reference not found in this document
2015 Copernicus Work Programme adopted by Commission Implementing Decision C(2015) 767 final of 17.02.2015

External links

Copernicus Programme
European Space Agency
Satellite meteorology